Fern Sutherland is a New Zealand actress, best known for her roles as Dawn in The Almighty Johnsons, and Detective Sims in The Brokenwood Mysteries.

Career
Starting her career as a lead artiste in short films produced by the UNITEC Performing Arts School, Sutherland pursued her acting work in theatre shows like Silo Theatre's Ensemble Project 08, the Auckland Theatre Company’s The Pohutakawa Tree (2009) and The End of the Golden Weather (2011), among others. Later, she ventured into television plays for South Pacific Pictures, doing small roles in Go Girls and The Almighty Johnsons. Most recently Sutherland has shared top billing in the miniseries The Brokenwood Mysteries.

She has said of herself, "I get extreme stage fright and really bad anxiety, so by rights acting is probably the worst career choice for me, but the truth is I really love being able to create and bring characters to life."

Sutherland received a nomination for best supporting actress at the 2011 Aotearoa Film and Television Awards (AFTAs) for her role in The Almighty Johnsons.

She moved to Canada at the end of 2018 shortly after filming of The Brokenwood Mysteries series ended.

Film

Television

2021- TD commercial.

References

External links
 
 

Living people
New Zealand actresses
New Zealand film actresses
New Zealand television actresses
1987 births